Heberto Juan Padilla (20 January 1932 – 25 September 2000) was a Cuban poet put to the center of the so-called Padilla affair when he was imprisoned for criticizing the Cuban government.  He was born in Puerta de Golpe, Pinar del Río, Cuba. His first book of poetry, Las rosas audaces (The Audacious Roses), was published in 1949. After his first marriage to Bertha Hernandez with whom he had three children, Giselle Padilla, Maria Padilla and Carlos Padilla, he married poet Belkis Cuza Malé with whom he had his younger son Ernesto Padilla.

Although Padilla initially supported the revolution led by Fidel Castro, by the late 1960s he began to criticize it openly and in 1971, he was imprisoned by the Castro regime.

Background
Padilla's criticism of the Castro Regime was prompted by the changing role of the writer in the new revolutionary society of Cuba, and the brewing hostilities between Cuban cultural bureaucrats and the Cuban writers. During the 1950s, writers in Cuba had shown strength and vigor in the production of cultural institutions and creative material, including the Casa de las Américas and the publication of Lunes de Revolución. However, cultural bureaucrats had begun to be more critical towards art produced, and banned the movie P.M., a film about night life in Cuba. This perpetuated already existing distrust between the Popular Socialist Party, and Lunes de Revolución, who had sponsored the television platform that P.M. was shown on. Following this crisis, the writers of Lunes de Revolución, among other Cuban writers, were invited to a series of discussions at the National Library, where leaders of the PSP accused them of being divisive and not truly socialist. The heated nature of these debates demanded the intervention of Fidel Castro, himself, who then, in this speech, outlined the government's cultural policy: there will be tolerance towards all forms of artistic expression, as long as there was a basic support for the Revolution.

Padilla began to get frustrated with the growing government interference in cultural affairs. In 1968, this underlying tension manifested in a debate published in the cultural magazine, El Caimán Barbudo, where Padilla wrote a scathing critique of Lisandro Otero's Pasión de Urbino, a novel that was considered for the Spanish Biblioteca Breve award, but was beat out by Tres Tristes Tigres by Guillermo Cabrera Infante. In Padilla's article, he denounces Pasión de Urbino, as well as its bureaucratic author, Otero, who was the Vice President of the Cultural Council. Padilla proceeded to praise Tres Tristes Tigres, calling it one of the most brilliant, ingenious and profoundly Cuban novels ever written. Therefore, Padilla not only attacked Otero, a high-ranking cultural official but praised Cabrera Infante, who had publicly condemned the Revolution and the conditions of writers within Cuba, dangerously branding Padilla as an ally to traitor to the Revolution. Following this scandal, the editorial board of El Caimán Barbudo that published this debate was fired and Padilla had also lost his job working at the Granma, or one of the government sanctioned news outlets in Cuba.

Padilla's frustration was only exacerbated when the Cuban Union of Writers and Artists, or the UNEAC, awarded the "Julián de Casal" to Heberto Padilla's collection of critical poems, Fuera del juego in 1968, which would allow it to be published and distributed to the public. Before Fuera del juego was published, the UNEAC had heavily criticized the decision, and underwent a series of discussions about the counterrevolutionary nature of the book. The series of poems contained blatant revolutionary skepticism, especially in the poem titled Fuera del juego, where he outlines the difference between a good revolutionary and a bad revolutionary. Although the poem, as well as the book, presents a critical stance on the Revolution, it does so to prevent the Revolution from "supra-bureaucracy or militarization". The decision, however, was upheld, and Fuera del juego was published with a political disclaimer, but the criticisms of Padilla's work did not halt here. A series of articles were posted in Verde Olivo, the magazine of the armed forces, under the name Leopaldo Avila, prompting a stricter outline of the government's cultural policy. The conditional tolerance of Cuban literature required more than just a basic support for the Revolution. Thus a declaration of principles was created and approved at the Congress of Writers and Artists in 1968 that further defined the role of the writer in Cuba, stating that the writer has to not only support the Revolution, but contribute to it through utilizing literature as a "weapon against weakness and problems which, directly or indirectly, could hinder this advance."

Affair

Imprisonment 
With the strengthening of the overall cultural policy of the Cuban government in an attempt to avoid the weakening of the Revolutionary ideology, vigilance towards Cuban writers had increased, punishing them for even slightly deviating from Castro's communist praxis. Thus on March 20, 1971, Heberto Padilla was arrested and jailed for his work, Fuera del juego. To illustrate the trivial nature of revolutionary vigilance, one of the charges brought against Fuera del juego was Padilla's conception of history, where he described time as a circle. This was seen as counterrevolutionary. In UNEAC's official point of view, they stated, "He has expressed his anti-historical attitude by means of exalting individualism in opposition to collective demands of a country in the midst of historical development and by also stating his idea of time as a reoccurring a repeating circle instead of an ascending line."

Controversy 
Padilla was released thirty-seven days after being imprisoned, but not before delivering a statement of self-criticism to a UNEAC meeting. In this statement he had confessed to the charges brought against him, describing himself to be what his adversaries accused him of being: a counterrevolutionary, subtle, insidious, and malignant. He had also accused other writers, including his own wife, and urged them to follow his lead of conforming to the Revolutionary society.

After Padilla's statement of self-criticism, a number of prominent Latin American, North American, and European intellectuals, including Mario Vargas Llosa, Julio Cortázar, Susan Sontag, and Jean-Paul Sartre, spoke out against Padilla's incarceration, and the resulting controversy came to be known as "the Padilla affair." The affair stirred a schism among political critics across the world, bringing many who had previously supported the Fidel Castro government to reconsider their position.

Though Padilla was released from prison, he was still not allowed to leave the country until 1980.

Aftermath 
He lived in New York, Washington, D.C. and Madrid, before finally settling in Princeton, NJ. Padilla was a Fellow at the Woodrow Wilson International Center for Scholars. Farrar Straus & Giroux published several editions of his poetry, a novel, En mi jardín pastan los héroes (translated as Heroes Are Grazing in My Garden), and a book of memoirs, La mala memoria (translated as Self-Portrait of the Other).

He was the Elena Amos Distinguished Scholar in Latin American Studies at Columbus State University, Columbus GA, 1999–2000. He died on 25 September 2000 while teaching at Auburn University in Alabama.

Works

Poetry
 Las rosas audaces, 1949
 El justo tiempo humano, 1962
 La hora, Cuadernos de Poesía 10 (Sets of Poems 10), La Tertulia, La Habana, 1964
 Fuera del juego, 1968
 Provocaciones, 1973
 Poesía y política - Poetry and Politics, bilingual anthology, Playor, Madrid, Georgetown University Cuban series, 1974
 El hombre junto al mar, Seix Barral, Barcelona, 1981
 Un puente, una casa de piedra, 1998
 Puerta de Golpe, anthology created by Belkis Cuza Malé, Linden Lane Press, 2013
 Una época para hablar, anthology that contains all of Padilla's poetry, Luminarias / Letras Cubanas, 2013

Narratives
 El buscavidas, novel, 1963
 En mi jardín pastan los héroes, novel, Editorial Argos Vergara, Barcelona, 1981
 La mala memoria, memoir, Plaza & Janés, Barcelona, 1989 (Eng. translation: Self-portrait of the other 1989)
 Prohibido el gato, political novel written in 1989

References

1932 births
2000 deaths
20th-century Cuban poets
Cuban male poets
Cuban emigrants to the United States
Auburn University faculty
Prisoners and detainees of Cuba
Cuban dissidents
20th-century male writers